This is a list of football transfers involving teams from the Argentine Primera División for the 2009–10 season.

July–August (winter) transfer window

Argentinos Juniors 

In:

Out:

Arsenal de Sarandí 

In:

Out:

Atlético Tucumán 

In:

Out:

Banfield 

In:

Out:

Boca Juniors 

In:

Out:

Chacarita Juniors 

In:

Out:

Colón de Santa Fe 

In:

Out:

Estudiantes de La Plata 

In:

Out:

Gimnasia y Esgrima La Plata 

In:

Out:

Godoy Cruz 

In:

Out:

Huracán 

In:

Out:

Independiente 

In:

Out:

Lanús 

In:

Out:

Newell's Old Boys 

In:

Out:

Racing Club 

In:

Out:

River Plate 

In:

Out:

Rosario Central 

In:

Out:

San Lorenzo 

In:

Out:

Tigre 

In:

Out:

Vélez Sársfield 

In:

Out:

January (Summer) transfer window

Argentinos Juniors 

In:

Out:

Arsenal de Sarandí 

In:

Out:

Atlético Tucumán 

In:

Out:

Banfield 

In:

Out:

Boca Juniors 

In:

Out:

Chacarita Juniors 

In:

Out:

Colón de Santa Fe 

In:

Out:

Estudiantes de La Plata 

In:

Out:

Gimnasia y Esgrima La Plata 

In:

Out:

Godoy Cruz 

In:

Out:

Huracán 

In:

Out:

Independiente 

In:

Out:

Lanús 

In:

Out:

Newell's Old Boys 

In:

Out:

Racing Club 

In:

Out:

River Plate 

In:

Out:

Rosario Central 

In:

Out:

San Lorenzo 

In:

Out:

Tigre 

In:

Out:

Vélez Sársfield 

In:

Out:

References

General references
 "Clausura '10 – Transferencias" Fútbol Pasión. Retrieved on March 6, 2010. 
 "Reforzados..." Olé. Retrieved on January 31, 2010. 
 "El Supermercado" Olé. Retrieved on August 16, 2009. 
 "La pelota está lista para rodar" El Día. Retrieved on August 18, 2009. 
 "Apertura '09 – Transferencias" Fútbol Pasión. Retrieved on August 20, 2009.

Specific references

2009-10
Football transfers summer 2009
Football transfers winter 2009–10
Transfers